Dicaelus is a genus of beetles in the family Carabidae, containing the following species:

 Dicaelus alternans Dejean, 1826 
 Dicaelus ambiguus Laferte-Senectere, 1841 
 Dicaelus chermocki Ball, 1959 
 Dicaelus costatus Leconte, 1848 
 Dicaelus crenatus Leconte, 1853
 Dicaelus dilatatus Say, 1823 
 Dicaelus elongatus Bonelli, 1813 
 Dicaelus franclemonti Ball, 1991 
 Dicaelus furvus Dejean, 1826 
 Dicaelus laevipennis Leconte, 1848 
 Dicaelus politus Dejean, 1826 
 Dicaelus purpuratus Bonelli, 1813 
 Dicaelus sculptilis Say, 1823 
 Dicaelus suffusus (Sasey, 1913) 
 Dicaelus teter Bonelli, 1813

References

Licininae